Life Beyond may refer to:

 Life Beyond, a web series by John Boswell
 Life Beyond the Box: Norman Stanley Fletcher, a comedy docudrama airing on BBC Television
 Life Beyond the Box: Margo Leadbetter, another comedy docudrama airing on BBC Television
 Life Beyond L.A., an album by Ambrosia
 Life Beyond Tourism, a nonprofit portal based in Italy
 Extraterrestrial life, often named "life beyond Earth."